Macroglossum limata is a moth of the family Sphingidae first described by Charles Swinhoe in 1892. It is known from Thailand, Vietnam and Indonesia.

References

Macroglossum
Moths described in 1892